The Burning Hills is a 1956 American CinemaScope Western directed by Stuart Heisler and starring Tab Hunter and Natalie Wood, based on a 1956 novel by Louis L'Amour.

Plot
When Trace Jordan's brother is murdered and several of their horses stolen, Trace sees by the tracks that three men are involved. One man wears Mexican spurs, one walks with  a limp, and one  smokes cheroots. Upon arriving in the town of Esperanza, Trace sees a destroyed sheriff's office and discovers the only law in Esperanza is Joe Sutton. He also discovers that the stolen horses have been rebranded with the Sutton brand, and their riders who match the description of their tracks work for Sutton. Trace enters Joe Sutton's (Ray Teal) ranch and wounds him in a shooting.

The enraged Sutton sends his son Jack (Skip Homeier), his foreman Ben (Claude Akins) and ten ranch hands to track down Trace before he goes to an Army fort to bring law to Esperanza. Wounded in his escape, Trace is helped by courageous half Mexican woman  named Maria Colton (Natalie Wood). Unable to locate the hidden Trace, Joe Sutton enlists a half Indian tracker Jacob Lantz (Eduard Franz).

Cast
 Tab Hunter as Trace Jordan
 Natalie Wood as Maria-Christina Colton
 Skip Homeier as Jack Sutton
 Eduard Franz as Jacob Lantz
 Earl Holliman as Mort Bayliss
 Claude Akins as Ben Hindeman
 Ray Teal as Joe Sutton
 Frank Puglia as Tio Perico
 Hal Baylor as Braun
 Tyler MacDuff as Wes Parker
 Rayford Barnes as Veach
 Tony Terry as Vincente Colton

Production
Louis L'Amour said he wrote the novel for Gary Cooper and Katy Jurado. Jurado tried to buy film rights to the novel.

L'Amour's short story "The Gift of Cochise" had been successfully filmed with John Wayne in 1953 as Hondo and there was interest in The Burning Hills. Warner Bros purchased the screen rights in May 1955 and assigned it to Richard Whorf to produce. Irving Wallace wrote the script and John Wayne was announced as a possible star. In December 1955 Tab Hunter was assigned to the lead.

The book ended up selling over a million copies.

Notes

External links
 
 
 
 

1956 films
1950s English-language films
Warner Bros. films
1956 Western (genre) films
Films directed by Stuart Heisler
Films based on American novels
Films based on Western (genre) novels
American Western (genre) films
Films based on works by Louis L'Amour
Films scored by David Buttolph
1950s American films